The Philips Nino is a so-called Palm-size PC, a predecessor to the Pocket PC platform. It was a PDA-style device with a stylus-operated touch screen. The Nino 200 and Nino 300 models had a monochrome screen while the Nino 500 had a color display. The Nino featured a Voice Control Software and Tegic T9.

See also
 Philips Velo

References 
 

Mobile computers
Philips products
Windows CE devices

A